Ambrosia is a cultivar of apple originating in British Columbia, Canada in the early 1990s. The original tree was first cultivated by the Mennell family of Similkameen Valley, British Columbia, who discovered it growing in their orchard.

Description
It has cream-coloured, firm meat with a sweet flavour reminiscent of pear and low acidity. 'Ambrosia' harvest is mid to late season. Trees are hardy and no major disadvantages have yet been identified. These apples flower in mid to late season, and are in flower group 4.

Ambrosia is most common in British Columbia, where it was discovered, and is the third most-produced apple in the province. It is also being produced in Ontario and Nova Scotia, as well as many other places around the world.

Parentage
The patent provides additional background. Parentage is suspected to be 'Starking Delicious' × 'Golden Delicious' because those apples existed in the orchard where the 'Ambrosia' was discovered growing.

Patent
Ambrosia is a "club" variety of apple, in which a cultivar is patented by an organization that sets quality standards and provides marketing, while production is limited to club members. The name was never trademarked, and the patent has expired in Canada and the United States. Centralized control allowed limitation of color variation to pink/red, as the variety would color differently in warmer climates. The patent expired in Canada in 2015, in the United States in 2017, and in Chile in 2021. It remains active in many other countries until as late as 2034. While under patent in Canada, the Mennells obtained plant breeders rights, and all growers were allowed, paying a royalty of C$2 per tree planting.

See also
 List of Canadian inventions and discoveries
 Jubilee apple
 McIntosh (apple)
 Spartan (apple)

References

Apple cultivars